Italy at the UCI Road World Championships is an overview of the Italian results at the UCI Road World Championships and UCI Junior Road World Championships.

List of medalists 
This a list of elite, under-23 Italian medals, but it doesn't list the amateur events. Since the 2012 UCI Road World Championships there is the men's and women's team time trial event for trade teams and these medals are included under the UCI registration country of the team.

Sources

Other Italian medalists
Since the 2012 UCI Road World Championships there is the men's and women's team time trial event for trade teams and these medals are included under the UCI registration country of the team. Here are listed of the medalists who won a medal with a non-Italian based team.

Medal table

Medals by year
The list doesn't include the men's amateur events

Medals by discipline
Updated during the 2015 UCI Road World Championships after 25 September
The list doesn't include the men's amateur events

References

Nations at the UCI Road World Championships
Italy at cycling events